Dudley Sargent DeGroot (November 10, 1899 – May 5, 1970) was an American athlete and coach, primarily of American football. He served as the head coach for the Washington Redskins of the National Football League (NFL) from 1944 and 1945, tallying a mark of 14–5–1; his winning percentage of .737 is the best in franchise history for coaches with at least one full season. DeGroot was also the head football coach at Santa Barbara State College—now the University of California, Santa Barbara (1926–1928), San Jose State University (1932–1939), the University of Rochester (1940–1943), West Virginia University (1948–1949), and the University of New Mexico (1950–1952), compiling a career college football record of 117–67–9. In addition, he served as the head coach of the Los Angeles Dons of the All-America Football Conference (AAFC) from 1946 to 1947.

Playing career
DeGroot's collegiate participation in sports records that at Stanford University he competed in basketball, football, swimming, and water polo. Playing under the head coach, Pop Warner, he became the Stanford Cardinal football team captain in 1922 and their first All-American athlete.

In both 1923 and 1924, DeGroot was the Intercollegiate Association of Amateur Athletes of America, 4A, ICAAAA, or IC4A, backstroke champion.

DeGroot was a member of the United States rugby team that won an Olympic gold medal during the 1924 competition in Paris. A journal by DeGroot about the activities of this Olympic rugby team was published throughout 23 days during July 1924 by the newspaper, The Call.

Coaching career
DeGroot's early coaching career included Santa Barbara State College, which is now one of the University of California campuses, and Menlo Junior College, the college level portion of Menlo School which became Menlo College in 1927 and now is independent, although they continue to share the same campus.

From 1932 through 1939, DeGroot was the head football coach at San Jose State University, where he put together a 60–19–8 record for the Spartans. His best season there came in 1939, when his team went undefeated and had outscored opponents 324 to 29. As of 2006 on a list published on Mercury News of the seven biggest turnarounds for a single season in the history of the Spartans, only DeGroot is listed twice, for 1932 and 1937. The statistics for these are: the record for the 1932 season is 7–0–2 with a previous season of 1–7 and a margin of six and, the record for the 1937 season is 11–2–1 with a previous season of 5–4 and another margin of six.

His next team leadership was at the University of Rochester, where he was football coach from 1940 through 1943. DeGroot's record there was 24–6.

Moving to professional sports, he then took over the Washington Redskins, a National Football League (NFL) team, in Washington, D.C. Although they lost the NFL championship for that year by one point, 15–14, to the Cleveland Rams, the Redskins won the Eastern Division title in 1945 with DeGroot as their coach.  During two seasons with the Los Angeles Dons of the new All-America Football Conference, DeGroot's record was 14–12–2.

DeGroot returned to collegiate coaching as the head football coach at West Virginia University during 1948 through 1949. His record for the West Virginia Mountaineers was 13–9–1.  At the University of New Mexico from 1950 through 1952, DeGroot's record was 13–17 for the Lobos.

Scientific recognition 
DeGroot received his doctorate degree in education and was recognized as one of the foremost oologists and ornithologists in the United States. His work in oology continues to be discussed in scientific publications.

Personal and family information
Notable members of his immediate family include his son, Dudley E. DeGroot, who obtained his doctorate degree in anthropology, and one of his daughters, Alice A. DeGroot, who became a large animal veterinarian holding patents for her inventions.

Death
DeGroot died at the age of 70 on May 5, 1970, at his home in El Cajon, California.

Head coaching record

College football

See also
 List of Olympic medalists in rugby union

References

External links
 

1899 births
1970 deaths
American football centers
American men's basketball players
American rugby union players
Medalists at the 1924 Summer Olympics
Olympic gold medalists for the United States in rugby
Rugby union players at the 1924 Summer Olympics
United States international rugby union players
Los Angeles Dons coaches
New Mexico Lobos football coaches
Rochester Yellowjackets football coaches
San Jose State Spartans football coaches
Stanford Cardinal football players
Stanford Cardinal men's basketball players
Stanford Cardinal men's swimmers
Stanford Cardinal men's water polo players
UC Santa Barbara Gauchos athletic directors
UC Santa Barbara Gauchos baseball coaches
UC Santa Barbara Gauchos football coaches
UC Santa Barbara Gauchos men's basketball coaches
Washington Redskins coaches
West Virginia Mountaineers football coaches
UC Santa Barbara Gauchos track and field coaches
Water polo players from Chicago
Sportspeople from El Cajon, California
Oologists
American ornithologists
20th-century American zoologists
Basketball players from Chicago
Swimmers from Chicago
Players of American football from Chicago
Sportspeople from Chicago
Washington Redskins head coaches